The 2022–2023 mpox outbreak in the Netherlands is an ongoing global outbreak which has also spread in the Netherlands. The RIVM declared the disease an A-disease which makes it mandatory to report suspected cases to the GGD. The first human case of mpox in the Netherlands has been identified at the 21 May 2022. The outbreak does have a noticeable impact at the society, especially with people spreading misinformation related to the virus. The ongoing COVID-19 pandemic in the Netherlands has increased the fear among the community for a new pandemic like mpox.

Background 

An ongoing outbreak of mpox was confirmed on 6 May 2022, beginning with a British resident who, after travelling to Nigeria (where the disease is endemic), presented symptoms consistent with mpox on 29 April 2022. The resident returned to the United Kingdom on 4 May, creating the country's index case of the outbreak. The origin of several of the cases of mpox in the United Kingdom is unknown. Some monitors saw community transmission taking place in the London area as of mid-May, but it has been suggested that cases were already spreading in Europe in the previous months.

Transmission 

A large portion of those infected were believed to have not recently traveled to areas of Africa where mpox is normally found, such as Nigeria, the Democratic Republic of the Congo as well as central and western Africa. It is believed to be transmitted by close contact with sick people, with extra caution for those individuals with lesions on their skin or genitals, along with their bedding and clothing. The CDC has also stated that individuals should avoid contact and consumption of dead animals such as rats, squirrels, monkeys and apes along with wild game or lotions derived from animals in Africa.

In addition to more common symptoms, such as fever, headache, swollen lymph nodes, and rashes or lesions, some patients have also experienced proctitis, an inflammation of the rectum lining. CDC has also warned clinicians to not rule out mpox in patients with sexually transmitted infections since there have been reports of co-infections with syphilis, gonorrhea, chlamydia, and herpes.

Statistics 
As of 4 July 2022, there are 818 cases of the mpox virus in the Netherlands and zero deaths. The RIVM does update their mpox statistics two times per week, usually at Monday and Thursday.

See also
 2022–2023 mpox outbreak in Asia
 2022–2023 mpox outbreak in Europe
 2022–2023 mpox outbreak in Canada
 2022–2023 mpox outbreak in Germany
 2022–2023 mpox outbreak in Portugal
 2022–2023 mpox outbreak in South Africa
 2022–2023 mpox outbreak in Spain
 2022–2023 mpox outbreak in the United Kingdom
 2022–2023 mpox outbreak in the United States
 Mpox in Nigeria
 Mpox in the Democratic Republic of the Congo

Notes

References

Netherlands
Mpox
Mpox